Solariellidae is a family of small sea snails, marine gastropod mollusks in the superfamily Trochoidea (according to the taxonomy of the Gastropoda by Bouchet & Rocroi, 2005).

This family has no subfamilies.

This family consists of extremely diverse species and needs taxonomic revision. The relationship between genera are often uncertain. Many species remain undescribed or have been recently described.

Description
Most species in this family are small, usually up to 10 mm. They show a diverse range of morphologies. The shell has a conical shape with rounded whorls and a wide umbilicus.

Distribution
The species in the family Solariellidae occur worldwide from the sublittoral zone to bathyal depths.

Genera 
Genera within the family Solariellidae include:
 Archiminolia Iredale, 1929
 Arxellia Vilvens, Williams & Herbert, 2014
 Bathymophila Dall, 1881
 Chonospeira Herbert & Williams, 2020
 Conominolia Finlay 1926 
 Hazuregyra Shikama, 1962
 Ilanga Hebert, 1987
 Lamellitrochus Quinn, 1991
 Microgaza Dall, 1881
 Minolia A. Adams, 1860
 Minolops Iredale, 1929
 Solariella S. V. Wood, 1824 - the type genus
 Spectamen Iredale, 1924
 Suavotrochus Dall, 1924
 Zetela Finlay, 1926

Genera brought into synonymy 
 Ethaliopsis Schepman, 1908: synonym of  Bathymophila Dall, 1881
 Machaeroplax Friele, 1877: synonym of Ilanga Hebert, 1987
 Zeminolia Finlay, 1926: synonym of  Solariella S. Wood, 1842

References 
Bibliography
 Vaught, K.C. (1989). A classification of the living Mollusca. American Malacologists: Melbourne, FL (USA). . XII, 195 pp
 Rolán E., 2005. Malacological Fauna From The Cape Verde Archipelago. Part 1, Polyplacophora and Gastropoda.
 
 
Citations

 
Trochoidea (superfamily)
Marine gastropods